Seven Stabs is the fourth major release from Dublin-based instrumental rock band The Redneck Manifesto. The album was recorded by bass player Richard Egan and self-produced in January 2006.

Track listing

References

The Redneck Manifesto (band) albums
2006 EPs